Vincent LoVerde (born April 14, 1989) is an American professional ice hockey defenseman. He is currently playing under contract with Kunlun Red Star of the Kontinental Hockey League (KHL).

Playing career
On January 9, 2013, LoVerde was loaned from the Ontario Reign of the ECHL, to AHL affiliate the Manchester Monarchs, on a professional tryout agreement.

On August 21, 2013, LoVerde was signed to a one-year AHL contract to remain with the Monarchs for the 2013-14 season. In establishing a regular position amongst the Monarchs defense, LoVerde contributed with a career high 20 points in 70 games.

LoVerde was rewarded for his impressive season in signing a one-year contract with NHL affiliate, the Los Angeles Kings, on May 16, 2014. During his time with the Ontario Reign, LoVerde served as the captain from 2015 to 2017. He was also invited to the 2016 and 2017 AHL All-Star Game.

On July 1, 2017, LoVerde left the Kings' affiliate clubs after 6 years, signing as a free agent to a two-year, two-way deal with the Toronto Maple Leafs.

As a free agent and having left a successful tenure within the Maple Leafs organization, LoVerde agreed to a one-year AHL contract with the Hartford Wolf Pack, affiliate to the New York Rangers, on July 1, 2019.

LoVerde played two seasons with the Wolf Pack, captaining the club through the 2020-21 campaign, before leaving the AHL as a free agent having made over 500 regular season appearances. On June 24, 2021, LoVerde signed his first contract abroad, agreeing to a one-year deal with Austrian based, EC Red Bull Salzburg of the ICE Hockey League (ICEHL).

Career statistics

Awards and honors

References

External links

1989 births
Living people
American men's ice hockey defensemen
Hartford Wolf Pack players
HC Kunlun Red Star players
Manchester Monarchs (AHL) players
Miami RedHawks men's ice hockey players
Ontario Reign (ECHL) players
Ontario Reign (AHL) players
EC Red Bull Salzburg players
Toronto Marlies players
Waterloo Black Hawks players